Colla was a settlement and station (mutatio) of ancient Thrace, inhabited during Roman and Byzantine times. 

Its site is located near Sığırcıl in European Turkey.

References

Populated places in ancient Thrace
Former populated places in Turkey
Roman towns and cities in Turkey
Populated places of the Byzantine Empire
History of Edirne Province